The Montecito Picture Company is a film production company that was founded by Ivan Reitman and Tom Pollock, then later Taylor Russell and Anthony Ramos. It is located on the Sony Pictures lot in Culver City, California, United States. Montecito is a city in California in Santa Barbara County.

History 

The company's predecessor was an entertainment production studio Northern Lights Entertainment, owned by Reitman. It originally started off with a deal at PolyGram Filmed Entertainment. Ultimately, the deal was in a dispute after Universal took control of the PolyGram assets and signed a first look deal with DreamWorks Pictures instead. On March 9, 2000, it extended its pact with writer/director Todd Phillips, after the success of the hit movie Road Trip.

After several years at DreamWorks, on February 18, 2009, the company signed a first-look deal with Paramount Pictures. The deal was ended on March 16, 2013; and in 2015 the company moved into offices on the Sony lot. Tom Pollock died in August 2020, and Ivan Reitman in February 2022.

Filmography

Television series

Alienators: Evolution Continues (2001)

References

External links
 IMDb Credits

Film production companies of the United States
American companies established in 1998
Companies based in Culver City, California